The Istanbul Challenger is a professional tennis tournament played on hard court. It is currently part of the ATP Challenger Tour. It is held annually in Istanbul, Turkey.

Past finals

Singles

Doubles

External links
Official website

ATP Challenger Tour
Hard court tennis tournaments
 
Recurring sporting events established in 1991
Sport in Istanbul
Tennis tournaments in Turkey
1991 establishments in Turkey